Bovet is a surname. Notable people with the surname include:

Daniel Bovet (1907–1992), Swiss-born Italian pharmacologist
Édouard Bovet (1797–1849), Swiss watchmaker, founder of Bovet Fleurier
George Bovet (1874–1946), Swiss politician
Guy Bovet (born 1942), Swiss organist and composer
Jorys Bovet (born 1993), French politician
Claude Bovet (born 1965), Swiss, Founder/Owner of hedge fund firm Lionscrest and Founder/Owner/CEO of GT racing team Blackthorn as well as racing driver

Surnames of Swiss origin